The 2020 Split Open was a professional tennis tournament played on clay courts. It was part of the 2020 ATP Challenger Tour. It took place in Split, Croatia between 28 September and 4 October 2020.

Singles main-draw entrants

Seeds

 Rankings are as of 21 September 2020.

Other entrants
The following players received wildcards into the singles main draw:
  Duje Ajduković
  Borna Gojo
  Nino Serdarušić

The following player received entry into the singles main draw as a special exempt:
  Tomás Martín Etcheverry

The following player received entry into the singles main draw using a protected ranking:
  Maximilian Marterer

The following players received entry from the qualifying draw:
  Marcelo Tomás Barrios Vera
  Altuğ Çelikbilek
  Malek Jaziri
  Peđa Krstin

Champions

Singles

 Francisco Cerúndolo def.  Pedro Sousa 4–6, 6–3, 7–6(7–4).

Doubles

 Treat Huey /  Nathaniel Lammons def.  André Göransson /  Hunter Reese 6–4, 7–6(7–3).

References

2020 ATP Challenger Tour
2020 in Croatian tennis
September 2020 sports events in Europe
October 2020 sports events in Europe
Split Open